The quaternion estimator algorithm (QUEST) is an algorithm designed to solve Wahba's problem, that consists of finding a rotation matrix between two coordinate systems from two sets of observations sampled in each system respectively. The key idea behind the algorithm is to find an expression of the loss function for the Wahba's problem as a quadratic form, using the Cayley–Hamilton theorem and the Newton–Raphson method to efficiently solve the eigenvalue problem and construct a numerically stable representation of the solution.

The algorithm was introduced by Malcolm D. Shuster in 1981, while working at Computer Sciences Corporation. While being in principle less robust than other methods such as Davenport's q method or singular value decomposition, the algorithm is significantly faster and reliable in practical applications, and it is used for attitude determination problem in fields such as robotics and avionics.

Formulation of the problem 

Wahba's problem consists of finding a rotation matrix  that minimises the loss function

It is possible to rewrite this as a maximisation problem of a gain function 

defined in such a way that the loss  attains a minimum when  is maximised. The gain  can in turn be rewritten as

where  is known as the attitude profile matrix.

In order to reduce the number of variables, the problem can be reformulated by parametrising the rotation as a unit quaternion  with vector part  and scalar part , representing the rotation of angle  around an axis whose direction is described by the vector , subject to the unity constraint . It is now possible to express  in terms of the quaternion parametrisation as

where  is the skew-symmetric matrix

.

Substituting  with the quaternion representation and simplifying the resulting expression, the gain function can be written as a quadratic form in 

where the  matrix

is defined from the quantities

This quadratic form can be optimised under the unity constraint by adding a Lagrange multiplier , obtaining an unconstrained gain function

that attains a maximum when

.

Solution of the characteristic equation 

as a system of two equations

where  is the Rodrigues vector. Substituting  in the second equation with the first, it is possible to derive an expression of the characteristic equation

.

Since , it follows that  and therefore  for an optimal solution (when the loss  is small). This permits to construct the optimal quaternion  by replacing  in the Rodrigues vector 

.

An alternative expression of the solution that does not involve the Rodrigues vector can be constructed using the Cayley–Hamilton theorem. The characteristic equation of a  matrix  is

where

The Cayley–Hamilton theorem states that any square matrix over a commutative ring satisfies its own characteristic equation, therefore

allowing to write

where

and for  this provides a new construction of the optimal vector

that gives the quaternion representation of the optimal rotation as

where

.

The value of  can be determined as a numerical solution of the characteristic equation. Replacing  inside the previously obtained characteristic equation

.

gives

where

whose root can be efficiently approximated with the Newton–Raphson method, taking 1 as initial guess of the solution in order to converge to the highest eigenvalue (using the fact, shown above, that  when the quaternion is close to the optimal solution).

See also 
 Triad method
 Wahba's problem

References

Sources

External links 
 
 

Rotation in three dimensions
Spacecraft attitude control